L'ordonnance is a 1933 French film by Victor Tourjanski based on Maupassant's story L'ordonnance. Tourjanski had already filmed the same story in 1921.

References

1933 films
French drama films
1930s French-language films
Films directed by Victor Tourjansky
Films based on works by Guy de Maupassant
1930s French films